Bukidnon's 3rd congressional district is one of the four congressional districts of the Philippines in the province of Bukidnon. It has been represented in the House of Representatives since 1987. The district encompasses the entire southern frontier of Bukidnon bordering the Davao and Soccksargen regions. It consists of the municipalities of Damulog, Dangcagan, Don Carlos, Kadingilan, Kibawe, Kitaotao, Maramag and Quezon. It is currently represented in the 19th Congress by Jose Maria Zubiri Jr. of the Bukidnon Paglaum Party (BPP).

Representation history

Election results

2022

2019

2016

2013

2010

See also
Legislative districts of Bukidnon

References

Congressional districts of the Philippines
Politics of Bukidnon
1987 establishments in the Philippines
Congressional districts of Northern Mindanao
Constituencies established in 1987